What's a Wife Worth? is a 1921 silent American melodrama film directed by Christy Cabanne and starring Casson Ferguson, Ruth Renick, and Cora Drew. It was released on March 27, 1921.

Cast list
 Casson Ferguson as Bruce Morrison
 Ruth Renick as Rose Kendall
 Cora Drew as Her aunt
 Virginia Caldwell as Jane Penfield
 Alec B. Francis as James Morrison
 Howard Gaye as Henry Burton
 Lillian Langdon as Mrs. Penfield
 Maxfield Stanley as Murray Penfield
 Charles Wyngate as Dr. Durant
 Helen Lynch as Girl in the Retrospect

References

External links

Films directed by Christy Cabanne
Film Booking Offices of America films
American silent feature films
American black-and-white films
Silent American drama films
1921 drama films
1921 films
Melodrama films
1920s American films